Neil Brannon (October 29, 1940 – September 22, 2020) was an American politician who served in the Oklahoma House of Representatives from the 3rd district from 2002 to 2010.

Brannon was born in Muse, Oklahoma. He went to Oklahoma State University. Brannon received his bachelor's and master's degrees in 1962 and 1972 from Northeastern Oklahoma A&M College. He was involved in education. Brannon lived in Arkoma, Oklahoma.

He died of a heart attack on September 22, 2020, in Fort Smith, Arkansas, at age 79.

References

1940 births
2020 deaths
People from Le Flore County, Oklahoma
Oklahoma State University alumni
Northeastern Oklahoma A&M College alumni
Educators from Oklahoma
Democratic Party members of the Oklahoma House of Representatives